Alpro is a European company based in Wevelgem, Belgium, that markets organic and non-organic, non-genetically modified, plant-based products, such as foods and drinks made from soy, almonds, hazelnuts, cashew, rice, oats or coconut. Alpro employs over 1,200 people in Europe and has three production facilities in Belgium, France and the United Kingdom. Alpro markets its products in Europe and beyond with the majority of its business in Europe.

History
Alpro was founded in 1980, as a subsidiary of the Vandemoortele Groep, which is based in Belgium. Alpro expanded across Europe and in 2000 built a soy milk plant in Burton Latimer, England.

In 2008 Alpro launched the UK's first "reduced calorie soya alternative to yogurt" following the introduction of its Soy Light "reduced calorie soya milk" in 2006.

Alpro's revenues are reported to have tripled during the period from 2000 to 2008. In 2009, beverages made up two-thirds of Alpro's revenues.

In June 2009 Vandemoortele sold Alpro for an estimated US$455 million to Dean Foods, which marketed the "Silk" soy milk brand in the USA.

In June 2013, WhiteWave, the Dean Foods subsidiary that managed Alpro, was spun-off as an independent company - listing on the New York Stock Exchange. In July 2013 Dean Foods sold their remaining 19.9% stake in WhiteWave, thus ending their involvement with Alpro.

In July 2016 it was announced that the French company Danone would purchase WhiteWave Foods for $10.4 billion.  The acquisition was completed in April 2017 and newly formed company is named "DanoneWave".

In 2020, Alpro's No Sugars oatmilk won the Lausanne Index Prize - Supreme Award, a processed food prize.

Alpro's General manager is Sue Garfitt.

Products

Alpro distributes soya based vegan products under the brands Belsoy, Alpro Soya and Provamel. Products include soya milk, soy yogurt, soya cream and soya based desserts, plant-based margarines and plant-based ice cream. All products are made from either non-GM soya, almonds, hazelnuts, cashew, rice, oats or coconut.

The Provamel brand is reserved exclusively for organic products (including many organic versions of Alpro Soya products), which are intended for sale only by independent health food retailers.

Alpro soya milk scored best (out of 16 tested different plain soy milks), when rated by Germany's leading consumer safety group Stiftung Warentest.

Other Alpro products include yogurt as well as "dessert and meat alternative products".

Marketing activities
To demonstrate Alpro's milk and yogurt alternatives, a year-long experiential marketing campaign gave consumers in the UK the opportunity to sample the breakfast menu products at various events and shopping centres around the country. Alpro also encouraged visitors to have their photo taken at the internet pod on the stand and upload it to Facebook, thereby joining the Alpro Soya Facebook page.

See also
 List of vegetarian and vegan companies

References

External links 

 

Food and drink companies of Belgium
Vegetarian companies and establishments
Soy product brands
Non-dairy yogurts
Food and drink companies established in 1980
Belgian companies established in 1980
Groupe Danone brands
Plant-based diets